Paul Spencer Clayton (born 4 January 1965) is a former professional footballer. His sons Harry and Max are currently professional footballers with Nantwich Town and Blackpool respectively.

Playing career
Clayton began his career with Norwich City. He was a member of the club's youth team that won the FA Youth Cup in 1983 and scored twice in the final. However, he was unable to establish himself in the Norwich first team - making just 15 league appearances without scoring - and moved to Darlington in 1988 for a fee of £25,000, a Darlington club record. After scoring three goals in 22 games he moved to Crewe Alexandra in 1989.

After playing non-league football for Macclesfield Town, Stafford Rangers, Stalybridge Celtic and Northwich Victoria, Clayton left football and worked for the National Health Service as a hospital theatre technician.

Personal life
Paul is married to Rowena Clayton and the couple have two sons who have both played for Crewe Alexandra, Harry and Max.

Honours
with Crewe Alexandra
Football League Fourth Division third-place promotion winner: 1988–89

Norwich City
FA Youth Cup winner 1983

References

External links
Career information at ex-canaries.co.uk

Sources
Canary Citizens by Mark Davage, John Eastwood, Kevin Platt, published by Jarrold Publishing, (2001), 

1965 births
Living people
Norwich City F.C. players
Darlington F.C. players
Crewe Alexandra F.C. players
Macclesfield Town F.C. players
English Football League players
People from Dunstable
Association football forwards
English footballers
English expatriate footballers
Expatriate footballers in Sweden
Stalybridge Celtic F.C. players
Stafford Rangers F.C. players
Northwich Victoria F.C. players
Footballers from Bedfordshire